Siarhey Novik (born 10 May 1993) is a Belarusian footballer playing currently for Ostrovets.

External links
 
 

1993 births
Living people
Belarusian footballers
Association football midfielders
FC Dinamo Minsk players
FC Bereza-2010 players
FC Slavia Mozyr players
FC Naftan Novopolotsk players
FC Vitebsk players
FC Smolevichi players
FC Baranovichi players
FC UAS Zhitkovichi players
FC Chist players
FC Molodechno players
FC Ostrovets players